Halifax West is a federal electoral district in Nova Scotia, Canada, that has been represented in the House of Commons of Canada since 1979. Its population in 2021 was 111,944.

Demographics

From the 2016 census
Ethnic groups:
White: 90.8%
Black: 2.7%
Arab: 2.4%
South Asian: 1.5%
Other: 2.6%

Languages:
English: 89.5%
French: 2.6%
Arabic: 2.4%
Chinese: 0.8%
Korean: 0.5%
Other: 4.2%

Religions:
Protestant: 43.0%
Catholic: 39.8%
Jewish: 2.4%
Muslim: 2.3%
Other Christian: 1.4%
Christian Orthodox: 1.1%
No religious affiliation: 8.4%

Education:
No certificate, diploma or degree: 16.1%
High school certificate: 22.4%
Apprenticeship or trade certificate or diploma: 9.1%
Community college, CEGEP or other non-university certificate or diploma: 19.1%
University certificate or diploma: 33.2%

Median Age:
38.0

Median total income:
$29,849

Average total income:
$37,831

Median household income:
$59,335

Average household income:
$72,291

Median family income:
$73,643

Average family income:
$85,379

Unemployment:
5.9%

Geography
The district includes the communities of Bedford, the west end  of Halifax, and an area that extends to the community of Upper Hammonds Plains in the north, Tantallon in the west and Terence Bay in the south.

History
The electoral district was created in 1976 from Halifax—East Hants riding. This riding lost territory to South Shore—St. Margarets as a result of the 2012 federal electoral redistribution.

Members of Parliament

This riding has elected the following Members of Parliament:

Election results

2021 general election

2019 general election

2015 general election

2011 general election

2008 general election

2006 general election

2004 general election

2000 general election

1997 general election

1993 general election

1988 general election

1984 general election

1980 general election

1979 general election

See also
 List of Canadian federal electoral districts
 Past Canadian electoral districts

References

Notes

External links
 Riding history for Halifax West (1976– ) from the Library of Parliament
Official Site of Geoff Regan, MP, Halifax West

Nova Scotia federal electoral districts
Politics of Halifax, Nova Scotia